Dušan Trizna (born October 1, 1967) is a Slovak ski mountaineer and was member of the SSA national squad. Until the split of Czechoslovakia in 1993, he competed for the Czechoslovak team.

Selected results 
 1998:
 4th, Patrouille des Glaciers  ("seniors I" ranking), together with Milan Madaj and Miroslav Leitner
 2001:
 7th, European Championship team race (together with Milan Madaj)
 2002:
 10th World Championship team race (together with Milan Madaj)

Pierra Menta 

 1993: 3rd, together with Miroslav Leitner
 1994: 2nd, together with Milan Madaj
 1995: 2nd, together with Milan Madaj
 1996: 3rd, together with Milan Madaj
 1998: 8th, together with Milan Madaj
 2000: 6th, together with Milan Madaj
 2001: 9th, together with Milan Madaj

References 

1967 births
Living people
Slovak male ski mountaineers
Czechoslovak male ski mountaineers